Thai PBS English News Service is the flagship English late night newscast of Thai PBS.

The newscast launched since October 24, 2011, during its coverage of worst floods in Thailand.

Personalities

Presenters
 Rungthip Chotnapalai
 Suphajon Klinsuwan

Reporters
 Bundit Kertbundit
 Chonlanat Koaykul
 Darin Klong-ugkara
 Hugh Adams
 Karnkorn Raktham
 Nantinee Lailaeiad
 Tawanchai Nakbanlung

See also
 Thai Public Broadcasting Service

Thai television shows